Outrepont is a commune in the Marne department in north-eastern France.

Geography
The village lies on the left bank of the Chée, which flows southwestward through the northern part of the commune and forms most of its northern border and part of its western border.

See also
Communes of the Marne department

References

Communes of Marne (department)